Ali Ak Chin is a populated place located in Pima County, Arizona, United States.

History
The name was created to avoid confusion with the village on the Papago Indian Reservation, Ak Chin, and means "little mouth of wash" in the Papago language.

Ali Ak Chin's population was 40 in the 1960 U.S. census.

References

Unincorporated communities in Pima County, Arizona
Unincorporated communities in Arizona